Tabaqeh (also Romanized as Ţabaqeh) is a village in Hana Rural District, in the Central District of Semirom County, Isfahan Province, Iran. At the 2006 census, its population was 37, in 7 families.

References 

Populated places in Semirom County